Taylor Draw is a valley and stream tributary to Animas Creek within Hidalgo County, New Mexico.

References

Rivers of Hidalgo County, New Mexico
Rivers of New Mexico